{{Infobox musical artist
| name             = Absinthe Green
| image            =
| image_size       =
| landscape        = 
| alt              =
| caption          =
| birth_name       = Eirini
| native_name      = Ειρήνη
| native_name_lang =
| alias            = Absinthe Green
| birth_date       = 
| birth_place      = Attica, Greece
| origin           = Greek
| death_date       = 
| death_place      =
| genre            = Rock, Heavy Metal, Gothic Metal, Industrial Metal , Thrash Metal, Death Metal, Alternative Rock, Dark Metal
| occupation       = Musician, Singer, Song writer
| instrument       = Electric bass, voice, keyboards
| years_active     = 
| label            = Massacre Records, The End Records, I for an I Records and Media
| associated_acts  = Enemy of the Sun, RandomWalk, Mora, Art of Negation, Deranged
| website          = 
}}Eirini “Absinthe Green” Papadopoulou' (born 13 August 1986 in Athens, Greece) is a female singer and bassist.

Early life
Growing up in a small country town in Peloponnese where the musical activities were limited, Green got her initial music incentives from her father and she started being interested in learning music at an early age. By the age of four she started taking music education classes, she had her first live performance as a singer in a town's conservatory event and by the age of six, she had already composed her first keyboard pieces.

Musical career
Her musical career goes back to 2000 when she started singing and playing keyboards in a classic rock and heavy metal cover band. In 2003, she formed the thrash metal band Deranged. After 2 years of performances and the release of  their Full Blown Madness EP, the band was disbanded due to studies and  military obligations of its members. During this time, she joined the old school metal act Art of Negation as a singer and songwriter, while she continued her classical and modern singing classes as well as Music studies in the university. After that she collaborated with various acts of the Greek metal scene. In 2007, she joined the  industrial Gothic metal band Mora as a bass player and backing vocalist. A year later, she joined the Athenian dark metal band Randomwalk as a bassist. She remained in RandomWalk until after the release of their second studio album, entitled Absolution. In 2011, Green decided to leave the band as she relocated in Germany to join  Enemy of the Sun, the thrash metal band of the metal producer Waldemar Sorychta. In 2012, Green decided to leave the band, stating personal reasons, as well as differences with the band's philosophy.

 Discography 

 with Deranged 
 Full Blown Madness (EP) (2004)

 with Mora 
 Left Behind (EP) (2008)

 with RandomWalk 
 Redemption (2008)
 Absolution (2010)

 Bands 

 Member 
 Deranged Art of Negation MORA RandomWalk Enemy of the Sun Guest member 
 Stellar Lake (EP vocals)(2008)
 Revolution Eve'' (Arise video clip guest bassist) (2012)

References

External links 
 
 Absinthe Green on Facebook

1986 births
Living people
Musicians from Athens
21st-century Greek women singers
Women bass guitarists
Singers from Athens
21st-century bass guitarists